The 1992 Montenegrin football championship season was the unofficial football competition in Montenegro, during the time period of FR Yugoslavia. Championship was organised by clubs who supported the independence of Montenegro, but the results of league and final ranking were not recognised by Montenegrin Football Association.

Championship played in period June - August, and November - December in 1992. FK Cetinje became first and only champion of Montenegrin football championship. They were the only professional team which participated in the competition.

Members

In the Montenegrin football championship participated 10 clubs from municipalities of Cetinje, Kotor and Nikšić.

FK Cetinje - Cetinje
FK Crnogorac - Kotor
Nikšić - Nikšić
FK Obod - Cetinje
FK Jadran - Kotor
FK Belveder - Cetinje
FK Sloga - Bajice
FK Crnogorac - Cetinje
FK Borac - Njeguši
FK Sloboda - Cetinje

Stadiums

The competition was held at several makeshift fields in Cetinje, near the Kotor, and in Njeguši. Final matches were played at Stadion Obilića Poljana in Cetinje.

Conditions

Due to the tense political situation in Montenegro, the championship was played without media attention. Then the only newspaper in the state has not published any articles about the competition. A lot of games have been played in secret. The last final match were played among 2,000 spectators, but broader, national public was not informed about that who is a champion.

Competition

First round

First matches (22–28 June 1992)

Second matches (9–20 July 1992)

Main phase

First leg (25 July 1992)

Second leg (1–3 August 1992)

Third leg (11–12 August 1992)

Fourth leg (19 August 1992)

Fifth leg (28 August 1992)

Table

1. Cetinje 4 3 1 0 11:4 7

2. Sloga Bajice 4 2 2 0 13:9 6

3. Crnogorac Kotor 4 2 1 1 11:5 5

4. Jadran Kotor 4 1 0 3 4:8 2

5. Borac Njeguši 4 0 0 4 6:18 0

Semifinals

First leg (11–14 November 1992)

Second leg (18–19 November 1992)

Finals

(1–8 December 1992)

Champion: FK Cetinje

Montenegrin
Football